A ceiling is the upper surface of a room.

Ceiling may also refer to:

Ceiling function in mathematics
Glass ceiling, a barrier to advancement of a qualified person
Ceiling (aeronautics), the maximum density altitude an aircraft can reach under a set of conditions
Price ceiling, an imposed limit on the price of a product
Ceiling (cloud), the height above ground at which (accumulated) cloud layers cover more than 50% of the sky
 Ceilings (album), an album by Dentist
"The Ceiling" (short story), a 2001 short story by American writer Kevin Brockmeier
 The Ceiling (album), a 2019 album by Jaws
 Katto, also known as The Ceiling, a short film that competed in the Short Film Palme d'Or group at the 2017 Cannes Film Festival

See also
Ceiling effect (disambiguation)